The sixth season of the television series Lud, Zbunjen, Normalan aired between November 3, 2014 and April 3, 2015 on Nova TV and TV Prva. The season contained 24 episodes.

Cast

Episodes

References

External links

Lud, zbunjen, normalan
2014 Bosnia and Herzegovina television seasons
2015 Bosnia and Herzegovina television seasons